The Cavbus Group is an Australian operator of bus companies in South East Queensland.

Cavanagh's Bus Service
In March 1952, Clyde and Clare Cavanagh entered a partnership with Wilfred Ryan to purchase three buses from King's Bus Co with services in Kempsey. The Cavanaghs later bought Ryan out and in 1965 purchased a further route from King's. In 1967, Cavanagh's Bus Service commenced operating camping tours throughout Australia.

In 1991, McKay's Bus Service was purchased followed by Mercury Roadlines in 1996. In 2002, a subsidiary was established in Port Macquarie under the Portbus brand. From January 2003 until December 2007, Cavanagh's operated services from Newcastle to Taree and Port Macquarie to Wauchope under contract to CountryLink. As at July 2017, the fleet consisted of 56 vehicles.

In July 2017, the Kempsey operation was acquired by Victorian operators Dineen Group. In February 2018, the Port Macquarie operation was acquired by the McGrady family.

Cavbus
In 2001, Cavbus was formed when Cavanagh's purchased the Beaudesert Bus Service and Logan Coaches businesses from Jim Hill. As at February 2018, the fleet consisted of 84 vehicles.

Depots are operated in Beaudesert, Ipswich and Logan Village.

Cavglass
In 1998, Glasshouse Country Coaches, Glass House Mountains was purchased by Jim Hill. In June 2007, the business was purchased by the Cavanagh's. As at August 2017, the fleet consisted of 29 vehicles.

References

External links
Cavanagh's Bus Service website
Glasshouse Country Coaches website
Logan Coaches website

Bus companies of New South Wales
Bus companies of Queensland
CountryLink
Mid North Coast
Public transport in Sunshine Coast, Queensland
Australian companies established in 1952